Carl Coetzee (born 3 August 1929) is a former South African cricket umpire. He stood in three Test matches in 1970.

See also
 List of Test cricket umpires

References

1929 births
Living people
Sportspeople from Cape Town
South African Test cricket umpires